The Fort Wayne Open, which played for one year as Fort Wayne Invitational, was a golf tournament on the PGA Tour from 1950 to 1956. It was played in Fort Wayne, Indiana. In 1950 it was played at the Orchard Ridge Country Club before moving to the Fort Wayne Elks Lodge No. 155 golf course, now known as the "Elks Course" at Coyote Creek Golf Club, an 18-hole, par-72 championship course built in 1928 and opened in 1929.

Golf legend Arnold Palmer earned his first professional paycheck ($145) at this event in 1955.

Winners

See also
History of sports in Fort Wayne, Indiana

References

Former PGA Tour events
Golf in Indiana
Sports in Fort Wayne, Indiana
Recurring sporting events established in 1950
1950 establishments in Indiana
1956 disestablishments in Indiana